Jess Fitzgerald (born 8 March 2002) is an Australian rules footballer playing for  in the AFL Women's (AFLW).

Early football
Growing up in Bundoora, Victoria, Fitzgerald played with the St Mary's Greensborough Kookaburras in the Yarra Junior Football League (YJFL) for four years from 2015 to 2018, amassing a total of 55 games with the team. She won the league best and fairest in the Under 15 Girls division in 2017. Fitzgerald attended school at Maribyrnong College, a specialist sports school. She began playing for the Northern Knights in 2018, as part of a development pathway from the YJFL to senior football. She played 11 games for the Knights in 2019, kicking 3 goals and averaging 14.1 disposals a game. Fitzgerald was awarded the best on ground award for the Grand Final, after she collected 16 disposals, four marks, five tackles and a behind. After the team's win, she stated "I'm not too much about the individual achievements, more about the team, I'll take it I guess, but really happy with the win." She also played for Vic Metro in the 2019 AFL Women's Under 18 Championships, playing two games, kicking a goal and averaging 14 disposals. She also played for the Northern Knights in 2020 but their season was cut short due to the impact of the COVID-19 pandemic. Despite the short season, she played 3 games and kicked 2 goals, both coming in the same match against the Dandenong Stingrays, while also averaging 18.7 disposals. She was named the co-captain of the team alongside future No.1 pick Ellie McKenzie.

AFLW career
On her debut, she collected 10 disposals, 1 mark and 3 tackles. In that game, she kicked her first goal, a running goal from 20 metres out, and also tallied up 15 disposals, 4 marks and a tackle. She won a rising star nomination for her performance in that game, alongside  player Tyla Hanks. A 2 goal performance in the ' upset win over  saw her named as one of the team's best, also collecting 12 disposals, a game-high 7 tackles and a behind. After having a relatively quiet end to the season, Fitzgerald won team's the Best Young Player Award. It was revealed that Fitzgerald had signed a contract extension with the club on 16 June 2021, after playing every game possible for the club that season.

Statistics
Statistics are correct to the end of the 2021 season.

|- style="background-color: #eaeaea"
! scope="row" style="text-align:center" | 2021
|style="text-align:center;"|
| 23 || 9 || 5 || 6 || 47 || 44 || 91 || 13 || 37 || 0.6 || 0.7 || 5.2 || 4.9 || 10.1 || 1.4 || 4.1 || 1
|- 
|- class="sortbottom"
! colspan=3| Career
! 9
! 5
! 6
! 47
! 44
! 91
! 13
! 37
! 0.6
! 0.7
! 5.2
! 4.9
! 10.1
! 1.4
! 4.1
! 1
|}

Personal life
Fitzgerald supported the Collingwood Football Club in her youth. She cited her favourite AFL player to watch as  forward Cody Weightman, and her favourite AFLW player to watch as either Kirsty Lamb or Jaimee Lambert.

References

External links

2002 births
Living people
Western Bulldogs (AFLW) players
Northern Knights players (NAB League Girls)
Australian rules footballers from Melbourne
People from Bundoora, Victoria